Ali Aqai may refer to:
Ali Aqai-ye Bala
Ali Aqai-ye Pain
Ali Aqai Hezarkhani